Vicente Guerrero is a small town and seat of the Vicente Guerrero Municipality in the Mexican state of Durango. As of 2010, the city of Vicente Guerrero had a population of 15,982.

Climate

External links
 Official government web site (Spanish)

References

Populated places in Durango